John Angus Campbell (born March 10, 1942, in Portland, Oregon, US) is a retired American professor of rhetoric and is a Fellow of the Center for Science and Culture (a branch of the Discovery Institute, a conservative Christian think tank) and of the International Society for Complexity, Information and Design, a professional society dedicated to the promotion of the pseudoscience of intelligent design.

Early life
John Angus Campbell was born on March 10, 1942, in Portland, Oregon. He earned a PhD from the University of Pittsburgh in 1968.

Career
Campbell served as an assistant and associate professor of communications at the University of Washington from 1968 to 1995, and as a professor of communications at the University of Memphis from 1995 until his retirement in 2005.  Together with Stephen C. Meyer (who is also a Fellow of the Center for Science and Culture) he edited Darwinism, Design and Public Education, a collection of articles from the journal Rhetoric and Public Affairs

Campbell was slated to appear as a witness for the defense in the Kitzmiller v. Dover Area School District trial, but withdrew on June 2, 2005, the day of his scheduled deposition.

In 2007 Campbell ran for a seat on the school board in North Mason County, Washington. He offered his services to "restore trust," and "establish transparency", but did not disclose his links to intelligent design. In a telephone interview he stated that he would not be dealing with curricula, and that he is a "Darwinist" who considers that debating Darwin can engage the interest of students and improve their skills in critical thinking. He was quoted as saying "Rather than demonizing people that believe in ID, I think there are ways people could use their ideas to study Darwinism more closely." The election was held on November 6, 2007, and the unofficial results showed John Campbell defeating the incumbent Glenn Landram by 2,996 votes (68.06%) to 1,406 (31.94%). He currently serves on the schoolboard.

References

External links
John Angus Campbell Biography from Discovery Institute
John Angus Campbell articles from Access Research Network
Court documents
Disclosure of Expert Testimony: John Angus Campbell, Ph.D.  Documented submitted as part of Kitzmiller v. Dover Area School District.  Includes Campbell's curriculum vitae and copies of published articles relayed to intelligent design.
 Stephen Meyer's affidavit regarding the termination of John Angus Campbell, William Dembski, and himself as expert witnesses by the Thomas More Law Center when they insisted on private counsel.

1942 births
Living people
University of Washington faculty
Discovery Institute fellows and advisors
Fellows of the International Society for Complexity, Information, and Design
Intelligent design movement
Educators from Portland, Oregon
University of Memphis faculty